César Láinez Sanjuán (born 10 April 1977) is a Spanish retired professional footballer who played as a goalkeeper, and is the manager of CD Teruel.

He played 69 La Liga games during six seasons, with Zaragoza and Villarreal.

Club career
A Real Zaragoza youth graduate, Zaragoza-born Láinez made his professional debut with its B-side, but struggled initially to find a first-team place. In January 1999 he served a six-month loan stint at Villarreal CF, playing three La Liga matches as the season ended in relegation.

After his return to Zaragoza, Láinez had to wait until the 2001–02 campaign to become first-choice, but his team would again be relegated. He was instrumental in the Aragonese club's immediate promotion, and subsequently helped it finish in a comfortable 12th place, also conquering the Copa del Rey after an extra time win against Real Madrid.

Láinez spent the entire 2004–05 recovering from knee surgery, and ultimately retired from football in May 2005, at only 28. He subsequently became a sports commentator for local TV channels.

Láinez returned to his lifetime club Zaragoza on 9 October 2014, being appointed manager of the reserves. On 19 March 2017 he replaced Raül Agné at the helm of the first team, who now competed in Segunda División.

On 9 June 2017, after managing to avoid relegation with the main squad, Láinez signed a new three-year contract with the reserve side.

Managerial statistics

Honours
Zaragoza
Copa del Rey: 2000–01, 2003–04

References

External links

1977 births
Living people
Footballers from Zaragoza
Spanish footballers
Association football goalkeepers
La Liga players
Segunda División players
Segunda División B players
Real Zaragoza B players
Real Zaragoza players
Villarreal CF players
Spain youth international footballers
Spanish football managers
Segunda División managers
Segunda División B managers
Real Zaragoza managers